Bakalovka (Baqal) is a rural locality (a village) in Tanalyksky Selsoviet, Khaybullinsky District, Bashkortostan, Russia. The population was 353 as of 2010. There are 2 streets.

Geography 
Bakalovka is located 32 km north of Akyar (the district's administrative centre) by road.

References 

Rural localities in Khaybullinsky District